Đakrông (means The big river) is a rural district of Quảng Trị province in the North Central Coast region of Vietnam. As of 2003 the district had a population of 31,529. The district covers an area of 1,223 km². The district capital lies at Krông Klang.

References

Districts of Quảng Trị province